United Nations Security Council Resolution 214, adopted on September 27, 1965, after expressing concern that the cease-fire called for in resolutions 209, 210 and 211 (and agreed to by India and Pakistan) was not holding, the Council demanded that the parties honor their commitment, cease-fire and withdraw all armed personnel.

The resolution was adopted without vote.

See also
Indo-Pakistani War of 1965
Kashmir conflict
List of United Nations Security Council Resolutions 201 to 300 (1965–1971)

References
Text of the Resolution at undocs.org

External links
 

 0214
Indo-Pakistani War of 1965
 0214
September 1965 events